Kyselica is a village and municipality in the Dunajská Streda District in the Trnava Region of south-west Slovakia.

History

The vinyard in its territory was already mentioned in 1205, but the village itself was first recorded in 1296 when Andrew III of Hungary donated an estate to a certain Chunt.

Until the end of World War I, it was part of Hungary and fell within the Somorja district of Pozsony County. After the Austro-Hungarian army disintegrated in November 1918, Czechoslovakian troops occupied the area. After the Treaty of Trianon of 1920, the village became officially part of Czechoslovakia. The village was actually cut into two by the new state border, the part remaining Hungarian territory became the village of Sérfenyősziget which is now part of Dunasziget. In November 1938, the First Vienna Award granted the area to Hungary and it was held by Hungary until 1945. 
In 1941, the village was administratively attached to Vojka. After Soviet occupation in 1945, Czechoslovakian administration returned and the village became officially part of Czechoslovakia in 1947. After World War II, many Hungarian civilians from the village were deported. The construction of the Gabčíkovo waterworks hindered its development as half of the village was pulled down due to the construction works. The territory of the village was partitioned between Vojka nad Dunajom and Rohovce in 1988, but became an independent municipality again in 1993 following a referendum.

Demography 
In 1910, the village 612, for the most part, Hungarian inhabitants.

At the 2001 Census the recorded population of the village was 123 while an end-2008 estimate by the Statistical Office had the village's population as 145. As of 2001, 78.86% of its population were Hungarians and 19.51% were Slovaks. Roman Catholicism is the majority religion of the village, its adherents numbering 95.12% of the total population.

References

External links 
Local news selection at www.parameter.sk 

Villages and municipalities in Dunajská Streda District
Hungarian communities in Slovakia